Finland competed at the 1932 Winter Olympics in Lake Placid, New York, United States. Finland has competed at every Winter Olympic Games.

Medalists

Cross-country skiing

Men

Figure skating

Men

Speed skating

Men

References

 Olympic Winter Games 1932, full results by sports-reference.com

Nations at the 1932 Winter Olympics
1932
Olympics, Winter